Vilmos Tamás Orbán (born 3 November 1992), known as Willi Orbán, is a professional footballer who plays as a centre-back for German Bundesliga club RB Leipzig. Born in Kaiserslautern, Germany, he plays internationally for the Hungary national team, for whom he qualifies through his father.

Personal life
Orbán was born and grew up in Kaiserslautern, Rhineland-Palatinate, Germany to a Hungarian father and a mother of Polish descent. However, his parents split up when he was two, leaving his mother to raise him and his sister, Sandra. Growing up, Orban said: "when I was a kid at home, I shot everything with my football. A few flower vases and bottles, nothing wild, but it was enough that Mama said: The boy has too much energy, we prefer to put it in a football club. Since she has done everything right." He revealed that his father was a karate master in his youth. Because of his Hungarian father, Orbán has a Hungarian passport.
Orbán attended Heinrich Heine High School in Kaiserslautern. Outside of football, Orban is a fan of classical music and plays the violin.

Club career

1. FC Kaiserslautern

Orbán started his career in the 1. FC Kaiserslautern youth academy as a 4 year old and progressed through the ranks of the club's academy by playing for the club's U17 and U19 sides.

At the start of the 2011–12 season, Orbán was then promoted to 1. FC Kaiserslautern II squad. Shortly after, he was called up to the first team by Manager Marco Kurz. He made first-team debut in a match against Bayern Munich on 27 August 2011. But his return was short–lived when he suffered an injury that kept him out for a month. Despite this, he signed his first professional contract with the club, keeping him until 2014. Orbán received his first start against 1. FC Nürnberg on 26 November, deputising for suspended right back Florian Dick. Orbán made the team 6 times in the Bundesliga, but spent most of his time with the reserve team, 1. FC Kaiserslautern II, in the fourth tier, scoring three goals in 23 matches.

Orbán split the following season with the first team and the reserve team, but managed to break into the first team down the stretch, starting 4 of Kaiserslautern's final 5 matches in the 2012–13 2. Bundesliga. He scored his first goal with the first team in a 3–1 victory over Jahn Regebsburg on 12 May 2013. Orbán also started both legs of Kaiserslautern's promotion playoff against 1899 Hoffenheim as the club sought an immediate return to the Bundesliga. Kaiserslautern lost 5–2 on aggregate, remaining in the second division. At the end of the 2012–13 season, he made nine appearances and scoring once in all competitions.

The 2013–14 season saw Orbán's breakthrough by getting more playing time, establishing himself in the centre–back position. On 26 July 2013, he signed a new contract with the club, keeping him until 2016. Orbán then captained the side for the first time on 12 August 2013, starting the whole game, in a 2–1 loss against Greuther Fürth. In a follow–up match against Erzgebirge Aue, Orbán suffered a broken nose, but continued to play throughout the match, which he wore a mask. In mid–September, Orbán began playing in the defensive midfield position, though he played in the centre–back position as well. It wasn't until on 20 October 2013 when he scored his first goal for the club, in a 2–2 draw against Karlsruher SC. Two months later on 3 December 2013 in the round of 16 of the DFB-Pokal, Orbán scored and set up the second goal of the goal, in a 3–1 win over Union Berlin. His third goal for the side came on 26 March 2014, in a 1–1 draw against Arminia Bielefeld. In a match against FC St. Pauli on 11 April 2014, Orbán was sent–off for a second bookable offence, as 1. FC Kaiserslautern won 3–2. At the end of the 2013–14 season, he went on to make thirty–two appearances and scoring three times in all competitions.

In the 2014–15 season, Orbán continued to regain his first team place for the side, initially starting out in the centre–back position. He then scored his first goal of the season on 12 August 2014, in a 1–0 win over FSV Frankfurt. Three months later on 14 December 2014, Orbán scored a brace, as 1. FC Kaiserslautern won 3–0 against Erzgebirge Aue. Following the departure of Srđan Lakić, it was announced that Orbán was named as a captain, succeeding Lakić. He captained the side in a number of matches for the rest of the season. During a 2–1 win over 1. FC Nürnberg on 14 March 2015, which he set up one of the goals, Orbán suffered an injury and had to be substituted in the 55th minute. But he quickly recovered from the injury he sustained against 1. FC Nürnberg. Orbán then scored his fourth goal of the season on 4 April 2015, in a 4–1 win over 1. FC Heidenheim. At the end of the 2014–15 season, he went on to make thirty–one appearances and scoring four times in all competitions. For his performance, Orbán was named the club's player of the year.

By the time of his departure, Orbán made seventy–seven appearances and scoring times in all competitions for 1. FC Kaiserslautern. During his time at 1. FC Kaiserslautern, he was the club's fan favourite and was subjected of a chant by supporters, calling him: "Williiiiie". However, upon moving to RB Leipzig, the move caused much anger from the fans of 1. FC Kaiserslautern.

RB Leipzig

In May 2015, Orbán joined league rivals RB Leipzig. The move reported to have cost 2.5 million euros transfer fee. He later said: "I switched mainly because of Ralf Rangnick. He can make any player better."

Orbán made his RB Leipzig debut in the opening game of the season, starting the whole game, in a 1–0 win over FSV Frankfurt. He quickly established himself in the starting eleven for the side, playing in the centre–back position. In mid–September, Orbán was a subject of fault for making two mistakes in the last three matches, leading him to be on probation. Despite this, Orbán continued to remain in the starting eleven for the side. After picking up his fifth yellow card of the season against SV Sandhausen, Orbán missed the contest against his former club, Kaiserslautern, through suspension. He scored his first goal for Leipzig in a 3–0 victory over Union Berlin on 19 February 2016, and was handed the captain's armband for two matches in March in the absence of regular captain Dominik Kaiser. Orbán was sent off on his first return to the Fritz-Walter-Stadion in Kaiserslautern, after picking up his second yellow card in the 63rd minute. During the match, he received mixed reception from 1. FC Kaiserslautern supporters. Orbán played nearly every minute of Leipzig's successful campaign in the 2. Bundesliga, and as a centre-back, was instrumental in Leipzig's league-leading defense. In his first season at RB Leipzig, Orbán went on to make thirty–three appearances and scoring once in all competitions.

In the 2016–17 season, Orbán continued to remain in the first team for the side, playing in the centre–back position. He was given the vice captaincy for the side ahead of the new season. After Dominik Kaiser was placed on the substitute bench against Hamburg on 17 September 2016, Orbán captained the side for the first time this season, where he set up a goal for Timo Werner, who went on to score twice, as RB Leipzig won 4–0. As a result, Orbán captained the side in the number of matches when Kaiser was not featured in the starting eleven. He then scored his first goal of the season, scoring from a header, which turns out to be a winning goal, in a 3–2 win over Bayer Leverkusen on 18 November 2016. His second goal of the season then came on 17 December 2016, once again scoring from a header, in a 2–0 win over Hertha BSC. Since the start of the 2016–17 season, Orbán started in every match until he was suspended for one match for picking up five yellow cards this season. After serving a one match ban, he returned to the starting lineup, retaining his captaincy and starting the whole game, in a 3–1 win over 1. FC Köln on 25 February 2017. However, later in the 2016–17 season, Orbán was sidelined, due to suspension, tactical changes and his own injury concern. His performance in the 2016–17 season earned praises from Ralf Rangnick and the German media, Bild and kicker. At the end of the 2016–17 season, Orbán went on to make twenty–nine appearances and scoring three times in all competitions.

Ahead of the 2017–18 season, Diego Demme and Orbán were among two candidates to be given a captain role by Manager Ralph Hasenhüttl, succeeding Kaiser. Orbán was officially named captain of RB Leipzig by manager Ralph Hasenhüttl on 11 August 2017. At the start of the 2017–18 season as captain, Orbán scored his first goal of the season, in a 4–1 win over Freiburg on 27 August 2017. He extended his contract until the summer of 2022 on 13 October 2017. Four days later on 17 October 2017, he scored his first UEFA Champions League goal, in a 3–2 win over Porto. However, Orbán was sent–off in the 13th minute for a professional foul, as Leipzig lost 2–0 against Bayern Munich on 28 October 2017. After serving a one match suspension, he returned to the starting lineup as captain, in a 2–2 draw against Bayer Leverkusen on 18 November 2017. Orbán scored his third goal of the season on 17 December 2017, in a 3–2 loss against Hertha BSC. He continued to stand out for the side as captain, as he helped the side finish sixth place and qualify for the UEFA Europa League. His leadership as the club's captain earned praise from Manager Ralph Hasenhüttl. Despite missing out eight matches during the 2017–18 season, he went on to make thirty–seven appearances and scoring four times in all competitions.

The 2018–19 season saw the returning management of Ralf Rangnick and made a decision to rotate captaincy given to different players. In the end, it was announced that Orban remained as captain for RB Leipzig. He then helped the side qualify for the UEFA Europa League Group Stage after beating the likes of BK Häcken, Universitatea Craiova and Zorya Luhansk. It wasn't until on 26 September 2018 when Orban scored his first goal of the season, in a 2–0 win over VfB Stuttgart. Having initially appeared in the substitute bench at the start of the season, Orban regained his first team place in the centre–back position, along with his captaincy. However, he soon lost his first team place and was demoted to the substitute bench, due to strong competition in the centre–back positions. By late–January, Orban regained his first team place in the centre–back position once again, along with his captaincy. He then scored twice for the side, in a 3–0 win over Hannover 96 on 1 February 2019. Orban led the club reach their first DFB-Pokal Final after beating Hamburger SV 3–1. In the final against Bayern Munich, Orbán started as captain and played for 70 minutes before being substituted, as RB Leipzig lost 3–0. At the end of the 2018–19 season, Orbán went on to make thirty–nine appearances and scoring four times in all competitions. In the 2019–20 UEFA Champions League, Orbán was part of the team which reached the semi-finals, but eventually lost 3–0 against Paris Saint-Germain. In April 2021, he extended his contract until June 2025. He played in the 2021 DFB-Pokal Final, which RB Leipzig lost 4–1 to Borussia Dortmund. At the end of the 2020–21 season, Orbán was voted "Player of the Season" by the Leipzig fans.

On 21 May 2022, RB Leipzig won the DFB-Pokal Final against Freiburg, in which Orbán scored in the penalty shootouts which ended in a 4–2 win, to be his club's first title in the competition. In February 2023, he was in doubt to play a Bundesliga match against Union Berlin, as he would donate his stem cells, being registered with the DKMS since 2017, in order to save a patient with blood cancer.

International career 

Orbán was born and grew up in Germany to a Hungarian father and a Polish mother, making him eligible for all three national teams: Germany, Hungary and Poland.

Orbán was a youth international for Germany. In November 2009, he was called up to the Germany U18 squad for the first time. However, he never played for the side despite being called up once more. In November 2014, Orbán was called up to the Germany U21 squad for the first time. He made his Germany U21 debut on 13 November 2014, coming on as a late substitute, in a 3–2 win over Netherlands U21. Orbán went on to make two appearances for the U21 side.

In August 2016, the club's sporting director Ralf Rangnick hinted that Orbán could potentially play for the national side. Two months later, he spoke out about the options in an interview with Bild, saying: "All three countries are still an option, Germany as one of the best football nations in the world remains for the time being my first address." His performance at RB Leipzig attracted attention from the German media over calls of including in the squad for the FIFA Confederations Cup. In response, Orbán made two separate interviews about his choice to play for, declaring his interests to play for the Germany national team. However, Orbán did not make the final cut to the FIFA Confederations Cup squad. Despite this, Orbán stated that he had not given up on a call-up to Germany team.

On 1 October 2018, Orbán elected to represent Hungary. The decision came after Hungary initially expressed interest in calling Orbán up to the national team about five months prior. Orbán made his debut in a 1–0 UEFA Nations League loss to Greece on 12 October 2018. On 15 November 2018, he scored his first goal in the national team in the 2018–19 UEFA Nations League C match against Estonia at the Groupama Aréna. Seven months later on 8 June 2019, Orbán scored twice for the side, as Hungary beat 3–1 Azerbaijan in the UEFA Euro 2020 qualification. On 8 October 2020, Orbán scored his 4th international goal for Hungary against Bulgaria in a European Championship qualifying play-off semi-final, as Hungary won 3–1 in Sofia.

On 1 June 2021, Orbán was included in the final 26-man squad to represent Hungary at the rescheduled UEFA Euro 2020 tournament.

Career statistics

Club

International

Scores and results list Hungary's goal tally first.

Honours
RB Leipzig
 DFB-Pokal: 2021–22
 2. Bundesliga promotion: 2015–16
Individual
 kicker Bundesliga Team of the Season: 2018–19

References

External links

Profile at the RB Leipzig website

1992 births
Living people
People from Kaiserslautern
Hungarian footballers
Hungary international footballers
German footballers
Germany youth international footballers
Germany under-21 international footballers
Association football defenders
Bundesliga players
2. Bundesliga players
RB Leipzig players
1. FC Kaiserslautern players
1. FC Kaiserslautern II players
UEFA Euro 2020 players
Hungarian people of Polish descent
Hungarian people of German descent
German people of Hungarian descent
German people of Polish descent
Footballers from Rhineland-Palatinate